HFI may refer to:

 Hamfest India, an amateur radio convention
 Handball Federation of India
 Healthy Forests Initiative, a United States federal law
 Hereditary fructose intolerance
 HFI Flooring Inc, a Canadian company
 Holy Family Institute
 Horizontal fiscal imbalance
 Human factors integration
 High Frequency Instrument, of the Planck spacecraft